is a Japanese voice actress with hundreds of television and video game productions, many multi-year, and is active in film and as a singer as well. She won the Best Lead Actress Award at the 8th Seiyu Awards. Satō has been appearing since 2003, and as of 2016 was affiliated with a talent-management agency, the Tokyo Actor's Consumer's Cooperative Society (東京俳優生活協同組合, Tōkyō Haiyū Seikatsu Kyōdō Kumiai), also known as Haikyō (俳協).

Biography
Satō was born in Fukuoka, the capital of Fukuoka Prefecture. She received training at the Haikyō Voice Actors Studio, finishing in 2001 in the "19th gen" class, and joined the Haikyō cooperative the next year.

Filmography

Anime

Film

Video games

Drama CD

Dubbing

Discography

Singles

Albums

Personal life
On New Year's Day 2017, Satō announced that she had been married since December 31.

On January 27, 2022, Satō tested positive for COVID-19.

As of 2022, Satō had qualifications in calligraphy (brush, hard brush first stage), and in Kyudo (third grade), and was licensed to drive a scooter.

References

External links
  
 
 
 Rina Satō at Oricon 

1981 births
Living people
Japanese women pop singers
Japanese video game actresses
Japanese voice actresses
Musicians from Fukuoka Prefecture
Tokyo Actor's Consumer's Cooperative Society voice actors
Voice actresses from Fukuoka Prefecture
Voice actors from Kitakyushu
21st-century Japanese actresses
21st-century Japanese women singers
21st-century Japanese singers